Euploea core, the common crow, is a common butterfly found in South Asia to Australia. In India it is also sometimes referred to as the common Indian crow, and in Australia as the Australian crow. It belongs to the crows and tigers subfamily Danainae (tribe Danaini).

E. core is a glossy-black, medium-sized  butterfly with rows of white spots on the margins of its wings. E. core is a slow, steady flier. Due to its unpalatability it is usually observed gliding through the air with a minimum of effort. As caterpillars, this species sequesters toxins from its food plant which are passed on from larva to pupa to the adult. While feeding, it is a very bold butterfly, taking a long time at each bunch of flowers. It can also be found mud-puddling with others of its species and often in mixed groups. The males of this species visit plants like Crotalaria and Heliotropium to replenish pheromone stocks which are used to attract a female during courtship.

The common crow is the most common representative of its genus, Euploea. Like the tigers (genus Danaus), the crows are inedible and thus mimicked by other Indian butterflies (see Batesian mimicry). In addition, the Indian species of the genus Euploea show another kind of mimicry, Müllerian mimicry. Accordingly, this species has been studied in greater detail than other members of its genus in India.

Description

The common crow is a glossy-black butterfly with brown undersides with white markings along the outer margins of both wings. The wingspan is about 8–9 cm and the body has prominent white spots. The male has a velvety black brand located near the rear edge on the upperside of the forewing. On the underside there is a white streak in the same location. This white streak is present in both male and female. In its natural position this streak is hidden behind the hindwing and can be seen only when the butterfly is captured and observed closely.

Excerpt from Fauna of British India: Butterflies, volume 1:

Subspecies
Subspecies of Euploea core are as follows:
E. c. amymone (Godart, 1819)
E. c. andamanensis Atkinson, 1874 – Andaman crow
E. c. asela Moore, 1877 – (Sri Lanka) spots are very small and the terminal spots vanish to the apex.
E. c. bauermanni Röber, 1885
E. c. charox Kirsch, 1877
E. c. core (Cramer, 1780) – (North India) spots are more or less equal or reduce in size.
E. c. distanti Moore, 1882
E. c. godarti Lucas, 1853
E. c. graminifera (Moore, 1883)
E. c. haworthi Lucas, 1853
E. c. kalaona Fruhstorfer, 1898
E. c. prunosa Moore, 1883
E. c. renellensis Carpenter, 1953
E. c. scherzeri Felder, 1862 – Nicobar crow
E. c. vermiculata Butler, 1866 – (India) upperside forewing spots increase in size towards the apex.

Mimicry and similar species  
Due to its inedibility, Euploea core is mimicked by a few edible species. Additionally a number of other inedible species within the same family mimic each other forming a Mullerian ring.

The edible species are contained in the two families:
Papilionidae - Malabar raven (Papilio dravidarum), common mime (Papilio clytia) form clytia
Nymphalidae - great eggfly (Hypolimnas bolina) female, Ceylon palmfly, Elymnias singala male and female

Distribution also plays a role in telling the species apart. Both Papilionids are forest dwellers and while the common mime is distributed in all forested areas in India, the Malabar raven is endemic to the Western Ghats south of Goa.

The inedible species are in the same genus forming a Mullerian ring
Brown king crow (E. klugii)
Double branded crow (E. sylvester)

Both these species differ in the number and size of brand and allied streak in the female, which can only be examined if the specimen is caught and closely examined. The double branded crow has two brands and the female has two white streaks on the underside. The brown king crow has a broad brand and the female has a short indistinct white streak on the underside

Range, habitat and habits
(Euploea core) with hair pencils everted to disperse sex pheromone at Sattal India

It is found in southern Pakistan, Sri Lanka, India, Bangladesh, Myanmar, Russia, and Australia.
It can be observed in all layers of vegetation and in all types of regions from arid land to forested areas. It can as commonly be seen gliding over the treetops as flitting about a foot off the ground searching for nectar flowers. In thick forests it is often seen moving along open tracks or following the course of a river.

The butterfly, being protected by its inedibility, has a leisurely flight. It is often seen flying about shrubs and bushes in search of its host plants. It visits a large variety of flowering plant species. When gliding E. core holds its wings at an angle just greater than the horizontal plane, maintaining its flight with a few measured wingbeats.

E. core is a nectar lover and visits flowers unhurriedly. It seems to prefer bunches to individual flowers. When feeding the butterfly is unhurried and is not easily disturbed. It can be approached closely at this time.

On hot days large numbers of these butterflies can be seen mud-puddling on wet sand. E. core is an avid mud-puddler often congregating in huge swarms along with other Euploea species as well as other danaids.

This butterfly also gathers on damaged parts of plants such as Crotalaria and Heliotropium to forage for pyrrolizidine alkaloids which are chemicals precursors to produce pheromones. During courtship the males of E. core release these sex pheromones to attract females. Once a female is in the vicinity the males glide around and with the help of a couple of yellow brush like organs extending out from the tip of the abdomen they disperse the scent in the air.

Along with other danaids, such as the tigers, E. core is one of the most common migrating butterfly species. Males and females in equal proportions have been seen to migrate.

Protection
The common crow is distasteful due to chemicals extracted from the latex of the food plants consumed in their caterpillar stage. Thus protected, they fly in a leisurely manner, gliding skilfully with wings held slightly above the horizontal. This indicates its protection due to inedibility to a predator. The inexperienced predator will try attacking it, but will learn soon enough to avoid this butterfly as the alkaloids in its body cause vomiting.

The butterfly has tough, leathery wings. When attacked it shams death and oozes liquid which causes any predators to release them and become nauseous. Once released the butterfly "recovers miraculously" and flies off. Predators experience enough trauma that the characteristics of the butterfly are imprinted in memory.

Life cycle

Eggs

Eggs are laid on the underside of young leaves of the host plants. The egg is shiny white, tall and pointed, with ribbed sides. Just before hatching the eggs turn greyish with a black top.

Caterpillar
Throughout its life the caterpillar stays on the underside of the leaves. The caterpillar is uniformly cylindrical, vividly coloured and smooth. It has alternate white and dark brown or black transverse bands. Just above the legs and prolegs, along the entire body is a wide orangish-red band interspersed with black spiracles. The most striking characteristics are the four pairs of long black tentacles. The first pair is movable and is also the longest. The tentacles are present on the 3rd, 4th, 6th, and 12th segments. The head is shiny, smooth and has alternating black and white semicircular bands.

Since the host plants contain poisonous latex, the caterpillar has evolved peculiar eating habits. It first chews the midrib of the leaf, cutting off the leaf's supply of latex and then goes on to nip a few of the secondary veins of the leaf, further blocking the flow of latex. Subsequently, the caterpillar feeds on the leaf but only where the leaf's natural defences have been turned off. The caterpillar is able to tolerate the plant toxins and stores it in its fatty tissue which helps make the adult distasteful to predators.

Pupa
The pupa of this species is shiny golden in colour and compact. The wing margins and margins of the abdominal segments are marked with broad colourless bands. The abdomen has a pair of black spots on each segment. The cremaster is black. Just before emergence the black wings show through the skin of the pupa. The species are attacked by parasitic flies.

Larval food plants
The common crow feeds on a large number of plants of the families 

 Apocynaceae (dogbanes, milkweeds and oleanders)
 Moraceae (figs)
 Rubiaceae, 
 Ulmaceae (nettles) 

and the specific species are -

 Aphananthe cuspidata,
 Asclepias curassavica, 
 Asclepias guadeloupe, 
 Asclepias syriaca,
 Calotropis gigantea,
 Carissa ovata,
 Cerbera manghas, 

 Cryptolepis pauciflora
 Cryptolepis sinensis,
 Cryptostegia madagascariensis,
 Cynanchum carnosum, 
 Ficus benghalensis,
 Ficus benjamina,
 Ficus hederacea,
 Ficus microcarpa
 Ficus obliqua,
 Ficus pandurata
 Ficus platypoda,
 Ficus pyriformis
 Ficus racemosa,
 Ficus religiosa,
 Ficus rubiginosa,
 Ficus variolosa,
 Gomphocarpus fruticosus,
 Gymnanthera oblonga,
 Hemidesmus indicus,
 Holarrhena pubescens
 Hoya australis
 Ichnocarpus frutescens,
 Marsdenia australis,
 Marsdenia rostrata,
 Marsdenia suaveolens,
 Nerium indicum,
 Nerium oleander,
 Parsonsia alboflavescens
 Parsonsia straminea
 Plumeria acuminata,
 Sarcostemma australe
 Secamone elliptica,
 Streblus asper,
 Toxocarpus wightianus,
 Trachelospermum bowringii, 
 Tylophora indica .

It usually has some preference for certain species in a given area. The more commonly used plants are Ficus racemosa, Nerium oleander, Nerium odorum, and Cryptolepis buchananii. Ficus pumila a cultivated garden plant which climbs on walls has also been noted.

See also
 Mimic
 Nymphalidae
 List of butterflies of India
 List of butterflies of India (Nymphalidae)

References

Further reading
 
 
 
 
 
 Arun, P.R. (2000) Seasonality and abundance of insects with special reference to butterflies (Lepidoptera: Rhopalocera) in a moist deciduous forest of Siruvani, Nilgiri Biosphere Reserve. South India. PhD thesis, Bharathiar University, Coimbatore. 236 p

External links

Sri Lanka Wild Information Database 
 Hosts database NHM UK
 ASEAN biodiversity database

Euploea
Insects of Pakistan
Butterflies of Asia
Butterflies of Indochina
Butterflies of Indonesia
Articles containing video clips
Taxa named by Pieter Cramer